Ehlo Huang (Pha̍k-fa-sṳ: Vòng Ngiu̍k-yùng; born April 1, 1977) is a Taiwanese actor and singer who is a member of Taiwanese group 183 Club. He is of Hakka and Amis descent.

Filmography

TV series

Films
Tai Bei Wang Jiu Chao Wu 臺北晚九朝五

References

External links
 

1977 births
Amis people
Living people
Taiwanese male television actors
Taiwanese people of Hakka descent
183 Club members
People from Hualien County
21st-century Taiwanese male actors
Taiwanese male film actors
Hakka musicians
21st-century Taiwanese  male singers